Parliamentary elections were held in Rwanda between 29 September and 2 October 2003. They were the first parliamentary elections since 1988 and the second multi-party national elections in the country's history. They were held following the approval of a new constitution in a referendum in August 2003.

The result was a victory for the Rwandan Patriotic Front-led coalition, which won 40 of the 53 elected seats in the new Chamber of Deputies, and eighteen of the 27 reserved for women, youth and the handicapped. Voter turnout was 96.5%.

Electoral system
The 80 members of the Chamber of Deputies consisted of 53 directly-elected members elected by proportional representation in a single nationwide constituency, 24 women elected by electoral colleges, and three members elected by mini-committees, two of which represented youth and one represented disabled people.

Campaign
AA total of 230 candidates contested the 53 directly-elected seats, with the official campaigning period starting on 5 September 2003.

Results

References

Elections in Rwanda
2003 in Rwanda
Rwanda
Parliament of Rwanda